
Ludwig Wolff (3 April 1893 – 9 November 1968) was a general in the Wehrmacht of Nazi Germany during World War II who commanded the XXXIII Army Corps. He was a recipient of the Knight's Cross of the Iron Cross with Oak Leaves.

Awards and decorations

 Iron Cross (1914) 2nd Class (November 1914) &1st Class (28 June 1917)

 Clasp to the Iron Cross (1939) 2nd Class (13 May 1940) &1st Class (18 May 1940)

 German Cross in Gold on 8 February 1942 as Generalmajor in the 22 Infanterie-Division
 Knight's Cross of the Iron Cross with Oak Leaves
 Knight's Cross on 26 May 1940 as Oberst and commander of Infanterie-Regiment 192
 Oak Leaves on 22 June 1942 as Generalmajor and commander of 22 Infanterie-Division (Luftlande) 55

References

Citations

Bibliography

 
 
 

1893 births
1968 deaths
Military personnel from Chemnitz
People from the Kingdom of Saxony
Generals of Infantry (Wehrmacht)
German Army personnel of World War I
Recipients of the clasp to the Iron Cross, 1st class
Recipients of the Gold German Cross
Recipients of the Knight's Cross of the Iron Cross with Oak Leaves
German prisoners of war in World War II held by the United States
Reichswehr personnel
German Army generals of World War II